Perumal is an Indian surname, which can also be found among the Indian diaspora. Notable people with the surname include:
A. Perumal (1923–1991), Indian politician
Azhagam Perumal (1965), Indian film director and actor
Bagavathi Perumal (1978), Indian actor, who has worked in Tamil films
Krishnamurthy Perumal (1943), Indian male field hockey player
Rajes Perumal (1985–2022), Malaysian professional footballer
Sasi Perumal (c. 1955 – 2015), Gandhian activist and anti-liquor activist from Salem, Tamil Nadu
Wilson Raj Perumal (1965),  convicted Singaporean match-fixer

Hindustani-language surnames
Surnames of Hindustani origin
Surnames of Indian origin
Surnames of Malaysian origin